The first American standard for analog television broadcast was developed by National Television System Committee (NTSC) in 1941. In 1961, it was assigned the designation System M.

In 1953, a second NTSC standard was adopted, which allowed for color television broadcast compatible with the existing stock of black-and-white receivers. It is one of three major color formats for analog television, the others being PAL and SECAM. NTSC color is usually associated with the System M. The only other broadcast television system to use NTSC color was the System J.

Since the introduction of digital sources (ex: DVD) the term "NTSC" might be used to refer to digital formats with number of active lines between 480 and 487 having 30 or 29.97 frames per second rate. This borrowed term should not be confused with the analog color system itself.

Geographic reach
The NTSC standard was used in most of the Americas (except Argentina, Brazil, Paraguay, and Uruguay), Myanmar, South Korea, Taiwan, Philippines, Japan, and some Pacific Islands nations and territories (see map).

Digital conversion
Most countries using the NTSC standard, as well as those using other analog television standards, have switched to, or are in process of switching to, newer digital television standards, with there being at least four different standards in use around the world. North America, parts of Central America, and South Korea are adopting or have adopted the ATSC standards, while other countries, such as Japan, are adopting or have adopted other standards instead of ATSC. After nearly 70 years, the majority of over-the-air NTSC transmissions in the United States ceased on January 1, 2010, and by August 31, 2011, in Canada and most other NTSC markets. The majority of NTSC transmissions ended in Japan on July 24, 2011, with the Japanese prefectures of Iwate, Miyagi, and Fukushima ending the next year. After a pilot program in 2013, most full-power analog stations in Mexico left the air on ten dates in 2015, with some 500 low-power and repeater stations allowed to remain in analog until the end of 2016. Digital broadcasting allows higher-resolution television, but digital standard definition television continues to use the frame rate and number of lines of resolution established by the analog NTSC standard.

History

The National Television System Committee was established in 1940 by the United States Federal Communications Commission (FCC) to resolve the conflicts between companies over the introduction of a nationwide analog television system in the United States. In March 1941, the committee issued a technical standard for black-and-white television that built upon a 1936 recommendation made by the Radio Manufacturers Association (RMA). Technical advancements of the vestigial side band technique allowed for the opportunity to increase the image resolution. The NTSC selected 525 scan lines as a compromise between RCA's 441-scan line standard (already being used by RCA's NBC TV network) and Philco's and DuMont's desire to increase the number of scan lines to between 605 and 800. The standard recommended a frame rate of 30 frames (images) per second, consisting of two interlaced fields per frame at 262.5 lines per field and 60 fields per second. Other standards in the final recommendation were an aspect ratio of 4:3, and frequency modulation (FM) for the sound signal (which was quite new at the time).

In January 1950, the committee was reconstituted to standardize color television. The FCC had briefly approved a 405-line field-sequential color television standard in October 1950, which was developed by CBS. The CBS system was incompatible with existing black-and-white receivers. It used a rotating color wheel, reduced the number of scan lines from 525 to 405, and increased the field rate from 60 to 144, but had an effective frame rate of only 24 frames per second. Legal action by rival RCA kept commercial use of the system off the air until June 1951, and regular broadcasts only lasted a few months before manufacture of all color television sets was banned by the Office of Defense Mobilization in October, ostensibly due to the Korean War. CBS rescinded its system in March 1953, and the FCC replaced it on December 17, 1953, with the NTSC color standard, which was cooperatively developed by several companies, including RCA and Philco.

In December 1953, the FCC unanimously approved what is now called the NTSC color television standard (later defined as RS-170a). The compatible color standard retained full backward compatibility with then-existing black-and-white television sets. Color information was added to the black-and-white image by introducing a color subcarrier of precisely 315/88 MHz (usually described as 3.579545 MHz±10 Hz or about 3.58 MHz).  The precise frequency was chosen so that horizontal line-rate modulation components of the chrominance signal fall exactly in between the horizontal line-rate modulation components of the luminance signal, thereby enabling the chrominance signal to be filtered out of the luminance signal with minor degradation of the luminance signal. (Also, minimize the visibility on existing sets that do not filter it out.)  Due to limitations of frequency divider circuits at the time the color standard was promulgated, the color subcarrier frequency was constructed as composite frequency assembled from small integers, in this case 5×7×9/(8×11) MHz.  The horizontal line rate was reduced to approximately 15,734 lines per second (3.579545×2/455 MHz = 9/572 MHz) from 15,750 lines per second, and the frame rate was reduced to 30/1.001 ≈ 29.970 frames per second (the horizontal line rate divided by 525 lines/frame) from 30 frames per second.  These changes amounted to 0.1 percent and were readily tolerated by then-existing television receivers.

The first publicly announced network television broadcast of a program using the NTSC "compatible color" system was an episode of NBC's Kukla, Fran and Ollie on August 30, 1953, although it was viewable in color only at the network's headquarters. The first nationwide viewing of NTSC color came on the following January 1 with the coast-to-coast broadcast of the Tournament of Roses Parade, viewable on prototype color receivers at special presentations across the country. The first color NTSC television camera was the RCA TK-40, used for experimental broadcasts in 1953; an improved version, the TK-40A, introduced in March 1954, was the first commercially available color television camera. Later that year, the improved TK-41 became the standard camera used throughout much of the 1960s.

The NTSC standard has been adopted by other countries, including some in the Americas and Japan.

With the advent of digital television, analog broadcasts were largely phased out. Most US NTSC broadcasters were required by the FCC to shut down their analog transmitters by February 17, 2009, however this was later moved to June 12, 2009. Low-power stations, Class A stations and translators were required to shut down by 2015, although an FCC extension allowed some of those stations operating on Channel 6 to operate until July 13, 2021. The remaining Canadian analog TV transmitters, in markets not subject to the mandatory transition in 2011, were scheduled to be shut down by January 14, 2022, under a schedule published by Innovation, Science and Economic Development Canada in 2017; however the scheduled transition dates have already passed for several stations listed that continue to broadcast in analog (e.g. CFJC-TV Kamloops, which has not yet transitioned to digital, is listed as having been required to transition by November 20, 2020).

Technical details

Resolution and refresh rate
NTSC color encoding is used with the System M television signal, which consists of  (approximately 29.97) interlaced frames of video per second. Each frame is composed of two fields, each consisting of 262.5 scan lines, for a total of 525 scan lines. The visible raster is made up of 486 scan lines. The later digital standard, Rec. 601, only uses 480 of these lines for visible raster. The remainder (the vertical blanking interval) allow for vertical synchronization and retrace. This blanking interval was originally designed to simply blank the electron beam of the receiver's CRT to allow for the simple analog circuits and slow vertical retrace of early TV receivers. However, some of these lines may now contain other data such as closed captioning and vertical interval timecode (VITC). In the complete raster (disregarding half lines due to interlacing) the even-numbered scan lines (every other line that would be even if counted in the video signal, e.g. {2, 4, 6, ..., 524}) are drawn in the first field, and the odd-numbered (every other line that would be odd if counted in the video signal, e.g. {1, 3, 5, ..., 525}) are drawn in the second field, to yield a flicker-free image at the field refresh frequency of  Hz (approximately 59.94 Hz). For comparison, 625 lines (576 visible) systems, usually used with PAL-B/G and SECAM color, and so have a higher vertical resolution, but a lower temporal resolution of 25 frames or 50 fields per second.

The NTSC field refresh frequency in the black-and-white system originally exactly matched the nominal 60 Hz frequency of alternating current power used in the United States. Matching the field refresh rate to the power source avoided intermodulation (also called beating), which produces rolling bars on the screen. Synchronization of the refresh rate to the power incidentally helped kinescope cameras record early live television broadcasts, as it was very simple to synchronize a film camera to capture one frame of video on each film frame by using the alternating current frequency to set the speed of the synchronous AC motor-drive camera. This, as mentioned, is how the NTSC field refresh frequency worked in the original black-and-white system; when color was added to the system, however, the refresh frequency was shifted slightly downward by 0.1%, to approximately 59.94 Hz, to eliminate stationary dot patterns in the difference frequency between the sound and color carriers (as explained below in §Color encoding). By the time the frame rate changed to accommodate color, it was nearly as easy to trigger the camera shutter from the video signal itself.

The actual figure of 525 lines was chosen as a consequence of the limitations of the vacuum-tube-based technologies of the day. In early TV systems, a master voltage-controlled oscillator was run at twice the horizontal line frequency, and this  frequency was divided down by the number of lines used (in this case 525) to give the field frequency (60 Hz in this case). This frequency was then compared with the 60 Hz power-line frequency and any discrepancy corrected by adjusting the frequency of the master oscillator. For interlaced scanning, an odd number of lines per frame was required in order to make the vertical retrace distance identical for the odd and even fields, which meant the master oscillator frequency had to be divided down by an odd number. At the time, the only practical method of frequency division was the use of a chain of vacuum tube multivibrators, the overall division ratio being the mathematical product of the division ratios of the chain. Since all the factors of an odd number also have to be odd numbers, it follows that all the dividers in the chain also had to divide by odd numbers, and these had to be relatively small due to the problems of thermal drift with vacuum tube devices. (For the same reason, 625-line PAL-B/G and SECAM uses , the old British 405-line system used , the French 819-line system used  etc.)

Colorimetry

The original 1953 color NTSC specification, still part of the United States Code of Federal Regulations, defined the colorimetric values of the system as follows:

Early color television receivers, such as the RCA CT-100, were faithful to this specification (which was based on prevailing motion picture standards), having a larger gamut than most of today's monitors. Their low-efficiency phosphors (notably in the Red) were weak and long-persistent, leaving trails after moving objects. Starting in the late 1950s, picture tube phosphors would sacrifice saturation for increased brightness; this deviation from the standard at both the receiver and broadcaster was the source of considerable color variation.

SMPTE C

To ensure more uniform color reproduction, receivers started to incorporate color correction circuits that converted the received signal—encoded for the colorimetric values listed above—into signals encoded for the phosphors actually used within the monitor. Since such color correction can not be performed accurately on the nonlinear gamma corrected signals transmitted, the adjustment can only be approximated, introducing both hue and luminance errors for highly saturated colors.

Similarly at the broadcaster stage, in 1968–69 the Conrac Corp., working with RCA, defined a set of controlled phosphors for use in broadcast color picture video monitors. This specification survives today as the SMPTE "C" phosphor specification:

As with home receivers, it was further recommended that studio monitors incorporate similar color correction circuits so that broadcasters would transmit pictures encoded for the original 1953 colorimetric values, in accordance with FCC standards.

In 1987, the Society of Motion Picture and Television Engineers (SMPTE) Committee on Television Technology, Working Group on Studio Monitor Colorimetry, adopted the SMPTE C (Conrac) phosphors for general use in Recommended Practice 145, prompting many manufacturers to modify their camera designs to directly encode for SMPTE "C" colorimetry without color correction, as approved in SMPTE standard 170M, "Composite Analog Video Signal – NTSC for Studio Applications" (1994). As a consequence, the ATSC digital television standard states that for 480i signals, SMPTE "C" colorimetry should be assumed unless colorimetric data is included in the transport stream.

Japanese NTSC never changed primaries and whitepoint to SMPTE "C", continuing to use the 1953 NTSC primaries and whitepoint. Both the PAL and SECAM systems used the original 1953 NTSC colorimetry as well until 1970; unlike NTSC, however, the European Broadcasting Union (EBU) rejected color correction in receivers and studio monitors that year and instead explicitly called for all equipment to directly encode signals for the "EBU" colorimetric values, further improving the color fidelity of those systems.

Color encoding
For backward compatibility with black-and-white television, NTSC uses a luminance-chrominance encoding system invented in 1938 by Georges Valensi. The three color picture signals are divided into Luminance (derived mathematically from the three separate color signals (Red, Green and Blue)) which takes the place of the original monochrome signal and Chrominance which carries only the color information. This process is applied to each color source by its own Colorplexer, thereby allowing a compatible color source to be managed as if it were an ordinary monochrome source. This allows black-and-white receivers to display NTSC color signals by simply ignoring the chrominance signal. Some black-and-white TVs sold in the U.S. after the introduction of color broadcasting in 1953 were designed to filter chroma out, but the early B&W sets did not do this and chrominance could be seen as a 'dot pattern' in highly colored areas of the picture.

In NTSC, chrominance is encoded using two color signals known as I (in-phase) and Q (in quadrature) in a process called QAM. The two signals each amplitude modulate 3.58 MHz carriers which are 90 degrees out of phase with each other and the result added together but with the carriers themselves being suppressed. The result can be viewed as a single sine wave with varying phase relative to a reference carrier and with varying amplitude. The varying phase represents the instantaneous color hue captured by a TV camera, and the amplitude represents the instantaneous color saturation. This 3.58 MHz subcarrier is then added to the Luminance to form the composite color signal which modulates the video signal carrier just as in monochrome transmission.

For a color TV to recover hue information from the color subcarrier, it must have a zero-phase reference to replace the previously suppressed carrier. The NTSC signal includes a short sample of this reference signal, known as the colorburst, located on the back porch of each horizontal synchronization pulse. The color burst consists of a minimum of eight cycles of the unmodulated (fixed phase and amplitude) color subcarrier. The TV receiver has a local oscillator, which is synchronized with these color bursts. Combining this reference phase signal derived from the color burst with the chrominance signal's amplitude and phase allows the recovery of the I and Q signals which when combined with the luminance information allows the reconstruction of a color image on the screen. Color TV has been said to really be colored TV because of the total separation of the brightness part of the picture from the color portion. In CRT televisions, the NTSC signal is turned into three color signals: red green and blue, each controlling that color electron gun. TV sets with digital circuitry use sampling techniques to process the signals but the result is the same. For both analog and digital sets processing an analog NTSC signal, the original three color signals are transmitted using three discrete signals (luminance, I and Q) and then recovered as three separate colors and combined as a color image.

When a transmitter broadcasts an NTSC signal, it amplitude-modulates a radio-frequency carrier with the NTSC signal just described, while it frequency-modulates a carrier 4.5 MHz higher with the audio signal. If non-linear distortion happens to the broadcast signal, the 3.579545 MHz color carrier may beat with the sound carrier to produce a dot pattern on the screen. To make the resulting pattern less noticeable, designers adjusted the original 15,750 Hz scanline rate down by a factor of 1.001 (0.1%) to match the audio carrier frequency divided by the factor 286, resulting in a field rate of approximately 59.94 Hz. This adjustment ensures that the difference between the sound carrier and the color subcarrier (the most problematic intermodulation product of the two carriers) is an odd multiple of half the line rate, which is the necessary condition for the dots on successive lines to be opposite in phase, making them least noticeable.

The 59.94 rate is derived from the following calculations. Designers chose to make the chrominance subcarrier frequency an n + 0.5 multiple of the line frequency to minimize interference between the luminance signal and the chrominance signal. (Another way this is often stated is that the color subcarrier frequency is an odd multiple of half the line frequency.) They then chose to make the audio subcarrier frequency an integer multiple of the line frequency to minimize visible (intermodulation) interference between the audio signal and the chrominance signal. The original black-and-white standard, with its 15,750 Hz line frequency and 4.5 MHz audio subcarrier, does not meet these requirements, so designers had either to raise the audio subcarrier frequency or lower the line frequency. Raising the audio subcarrier frequency would prevent existing (black and white) receivers from properly tuning in the audio signal. Lowering the line frequency is comparatively innocuous, because the horizontal and vertical synchronization information in the NTSC signal allows a receiver to tolerate a substantial amount of variation in the line frequency. So the engineers chose the line frequency to be changed for the color standard. In the black-and-white standard, the ratio of audio subcarrier frequency to line frequency is   285.71. In the color standard, this becomes rounded to the integer 286, which means the color standard's line rate is  ≈ 15,734 Hz. Maintaining the same number of scan lines per field (and frame), the lower line rate must yield a lower field rate. Dividing  lines per second by 262.5 lines per field gives approximately 59.94 fields per second.

Transmission modulation method

An NTSC television channel as transmitted occupies a total bandwidth of 6 MHz. The actual video signal, which is amplitude-modulated, is transmitted between 500 kHz and 5.45 MHz above the lower bound of the channel. The video carrier is 1.25 MHz above the lower bound of the channel. Like most AM signals, the video carrier generates two sidebands, one above the carrier and one below. The sidebands are each 4.2 MHz wide. The entire upper sideband is transmitted, but only 1.25 MHz of the lower sideband, known as a vestigial sideband, is transmitted. The color subcarrier, as noted above, is 3.579545 MHz above the video carrier, and is quadrature-amplitude-modulated with a suppressed carrier. The audio signal is frequency-modulated, like the audio signals broadcast by FM radio stations in the 88–108 MHz band, but with a 25 kHz maximum frequency deviation, as opposed to 75 kHz as is used on the FM band, making analog television audio signals sound quieter than FM radio signals as received on a wideband receiver. The main audio carrier is 4.5 MHz above the video carrier, making it 250 kHz below the top of the channel. Sometimes a channel may contain an MTS signal, which offers more than one audio signal by adding one or two subcarriers on the audio signal, each synchronized to a multiple of the line frequency. This is normally the case when stereo audio and/or second audio program signals are used. The same extensions are used in ATSC, where the ATSC digital carrier is broadcast at 0.31 MHz above the lower bound of the channel.

"Setup" is a 54 mV (7.5 IRE) voltage offset between the "black" and "blanking" levels. It is unique to NTSC. CVBS stands for Color, Video, Blanking, and Sync.

The following table shows the values for the basic RGB colors, encoded in NTSC

Frame rate conversion

There is a large difference in frame rate between film, which runs at 24.0 frames per second, and the NTSC standard, which runs at approximately 29.97 (10 MHz×63/88/455/525) frames per second.
In regions that use 25-fps television and video standards, this difference can be overcome by speed-up.

For 30-fps standards, a process called "3:2 pulldown" is used. One film frame is transmitted for three video fields (lasting  video frames), and the next frame is transmitted for two video fields (lasting 1 video frame). Two film frames are thus transmitted in five video fields, for an average of  video fields per film frame. The average frame rate is thus 60 ÷ 2.5 = 24 frames per second, so the average film speed is nominally exactly what it should be. (In reality, over the course of an hour of real time, 215,827.2 video fields are displayed, representing 86,330.88 frames of film, while in an hour of true 24-fps film projection, exactly 86,400 frames are shown: thus, 29.97-fps NTSC transmission of 24-fps film runs at 99.92% of the film's normal speed.) Still-framing on playback can display a video frame with fields from two different film frames, so any difference between the frames will appear as a rapid back-and-forth flicker. There can also be noticeable jitter/"stutter" during slow camera pans (telecine judder).

To avoid 3:2 pulldown, film shot specifically for NTSC television is often taken at 30 frames per second.

To show 25-fps material (such as European television series and some European movies) on NTSC equipment, every fifth frame is duplicated and then the resulting stream is interlaced.

Film shot for NTSC television at 24 frames per second has traditionally been accelerated by 1/24 (to about 104.17% of normal speed) for transmission in regions that use 25-fps television standards. This increase in picture speed has traditionally been accompanied by a similar increase in the pitch and tempo of the audio. More recently, frame-blending has been used to convert 24 FPS video to 25 FPS without altering its speed.

Film shot for television in regions that use 25-fps television standards can be handled in either of two ways:

 The film can be shot at 24 frames per second. In this case, when transmitted in its native region, the film may be accelerated to 25 fps according to the analog technique described above, or kept at 24 fps by the digital technique described above. When the same film is transmitted in regions that use a nominal 30-fps television standard, there is no noticeable change in speed, tempo, and pitch.
 The film can be shot at 25 frames per second. In this case, when transmitted in its native region, the film is shown at its normal speed, with no alteration of the accompanying soundtrack. When the same film is shown in regions that use a 30-fps nominal television standard, every fifth frame is duplicated, and there is still no noticeable change in speed, tempo, and pitch.

Because both film speeds have been used in 25-fps regions, viewers can face confusion about the true speed of video and audio, and the pitch of voices, sound effects, and musical performances, in television films from those regions. For example, they may wonder whether the Jeremy Brett series of Sherlock Holmes television films, made in the 1980s and early 1990s, was shot at 24 fps and then transmitted at an artificially fast speed in 25-fps regions, or whether it was shot at 25 fps natively and then slowed to 24 fps for NTSC exhibition.

These discrepancies exist not only in television broadcasts over the air and through cable, but also in the home-video market, on both tape and disc, including laser disc and DVD.

In digital television and video, which are replacing their analog predecessors, single standards that can accommodate a wider range of frame rates still show the limits of analog regional standards. The initial version of the ATSC standard, for example, allowed frame rates of 23.976, 24, 29.97, 30, 59.94, 60, 119.88 and 120 frames per second, but not 25 and 50. Modern ATSC allows 25 and 50 FPS.

Modulation for analog satellite transmission
Because satellite power is severely limited, analog video transmission through satellites differs from terrestrial TV transmission. AM is a linear modulation method, so a given demodulated signal-to-noise ratio (SNR) requires an equally high received RF SNR. The SNR of studio quality video is over 50 dB, so AM would require prohibitively high powers and/or large antennas.

Wideband FM is used instead to trade RF bandwidth for reduced power. Increasing the channel bandwidth from 6 to 36 MHz allows a RF SNR of only 10 dB or less. The wider noise bandwidth reduces this 40 dB power saving by 36 MHz / 6 MHz = 8 dB for a substantial net reduction of 32 dB.

Sound is on an FM subcarrier as in terrestrial transmission, but frequencies above 4.5 MHz are used to reduce aural/visual interference. 6.8, 5.8 and 6.2 MHz are commonly used. Stereo can be multiplex, discrete, or matrix and unrelated audio and data signals may be placed on additional subcarriers.

A triangular 60 Hz energy dispersal waveform is added to the composite baseband signal (video plus audio and data subcarriers) before modulation. This limits the satellite downlink power spectral density in case the video signal is lost. Otherwise the satellite might transmit all of its power on a single frequency, interfering with terrestrial microwave links in the same frequency band.

In half transponder mode, the frequency deviation of the composite baseband signal is reduced to 18 MHz to allow another signal in the other half of the 36 MHz transponder. This reduces the FM benefit somewhat, and the recovered SNRs are further reduced because the combined signal power must be "backed off" to avoid intermodulation distortion in the satellite transponder. A single FM signal is constant amplitude, so it can saturate a transponder without distortion.

Field order
An NTSC frame consists of two fields, F1 (field one) and F2 (field two). The field dominance depends on a combination of factors, including decisions by various equipment manufacturers as well as historical conventions. As a result, most professional equipment has the option to switch between a dominant upper or dominant lower field. It is not advisable to use the terms even or odd when speaking of fields, due to substantial ambiguity. For instance if the line numbering for a particular system starts at zero, while another system starts its line numbering at one. As such the same field could be even or odd. 

While an analog television set does not care about field dominance per se, field dominance is important when editing NTSC video. Incorrect interpretation of field order can cause a shuddering effect as moving objects jump forward and behind on each successive field.

This is of particular importance when interlaced NTSC is transcoded to a format with a different field dominance and vice versa. Field order is also important when transcoding progressive video to interlaced NTSC, as any place there is a cut between two scenes in the progressive video, there could be a flash field in the interlaced video if the field dominance is incorrect. The film telecine process where a three-two pull down is utilized to convert 24 frames to 30, will also provide unacceptable results if the field order is incorrect.

Because each field is temporally unique for material captured with an interlaced camera, converting interlaced to a digital progressive-frame medium is difficult, as each progressive frame will have artifacts of motion on every alternating line. This can be observed in PC-based video-playing utilities and is frequently solved simply by transcoding the video at half resolution and only using one of the two available fields.

Variants

NTSC-M
Unlike PAL and SECAM, with its many varied underlying broadcast television systems in use throughout the world, NTSC color encoding is almost invariably used with broadcast system M, giving NTSC-M.

NTSC-N/NTSC50
NTSC-N/NTSC50 is an unofficial system combining 625-line video with 3.58 MHz NTSC color. PAL software running on an NTSC Atari ST displays using this system as it cannot display PAL color. Television sets and monitors with a V-Hold knob can display this system after adjusting the vertical hold.

NTSC-J
Only Japan's variant "NTSC-J" is slightly different: in Japan, black level and blanking level of the signal are identical (at 0 IRE), as they are in PAL, while in American NTSC, black level is slightly higher (7.5 IRE) than blanking level. Since the difference is quite small, a slight turn of the brightness knob is all that is required to correctly show the "other" variant of NTSC on any set as it is supposed to be; most watchers might not even notice the difference in the first place. The channel encoding on NTSC-J differs slightly from NTSC-M. In particular, the Japanese VHF band runs from channels 1–12 (located on frequencies directly above the 76–90 MHz Japanese FM radio band) while the North American VHF TV band uses channels 2–13 (54–72 MHz, 76–88 MHz and 174–216 MHz) with 88–108 MHz allocated to FM radio broadcasting. Japan's UHF TV channels are therefore numbered from 13 up and not 14 up, but otherwise uses the same UHF broadcasting frequencies as those in North America.

NTSC 4.43
NTSC 4.43 is a pseudo-system that transmits a NTSC color subcarrier of 4.43 MHz instead of 3.58 MHz The resulting output is only viewable by TVs that support the resulting pseudo-system (such as most PAL TVs). Using a native NTSC TV to decode the signal yields no color, while using an incompatible PAL TV to decode the system yields erratic colors (observed to be lacking red and flickering randomly). The format was used by the USAF TV based in Germany during the Cold War. It was also found as an optional output on some LaserDisc players and some game consoles sold in markets where the PAL system is used.

The NTSC 4.43 system, while not a broadcast format, appears most often as a playback function of PAL cassette format VCRs, beginning with the Sony 3/4" U-Matic format and then following onto Betamax and VHS format machines, commonly advertised as "NTSC playback on PAL TV". As Hollywood has the claim of providing the most cassette software (movies and television series) for VCRs for the world's viewers, and as not all cassette releases were made available in PAL formats, a means of playing NTSC format cassettes was highly desired.

Multi-standard video monitors were already in use in Europe to accommodate broadcast sources in PAL, SECAM, and NTSC video formats. The heterodyne color-under process of U-Matic, Betamax & VHS lent itself to minor modification of VCR players to accommodate NTSC format cassettes. The color-under format of VHS uses a 629 kHz subcarrier while U-Matic & Betamax use a 688 kHz subcarrier to carry an amplitude modulated chroma signal for both NTSC and PAL formats. Since the VCR was ready to play the color portion of the NTSC recording using PAL color mode, the PAL scanner and capstan speeds had to be adjusted from PAL's 50 Hz field rate to NTSC's 59.94 Hz field rate, and faster linear tape speed.

The changes to the PAL VCR are minor thanks to the existing VCR recording formats. The output of the VCR when playing an NTSC cassette in NTSC 4.43 mode is 525 lines/29.97 frames per second with PAL compatible heterodyned color. The multi-standard receiver is already set to support the NTSC H & V frequencies; it just needs to do so while receiving PAL color.

The existence of those multi-standard receivers was probably part of the drive for region coding of DVDs. As the color signals are component on disc for all display formats, almost no changes would be required for PAL DVD players to play NTSC (525/29.97) discs as long as the display was frame-rate compatible.

OSKM (USSR-NTSC)

In January 1960 (7 years prior to adoption of the modified SECAM version) the experimental TV studio in Moscow started broadcasting using the OSKM system. OSKM was the version of NTSC adapted to European D/K 625/50 standard. The OSKM abbreviation means "Simultaneous system with quadrature modulation" (In Russian: Одновременная Система с Квадратурной Модуляцией). It used the color coding scheme that was later used in PAL (U and V instead of I and Q).

The color subcarrier frequency was 4.4296875 MHz and the bandwidth of U and V signals was near 1.5 MHz. Only circa 4000 TV sets of 4 models (Raduga, Temp-22, Izumrud-201 and Izumrud-203) were produced for studying the real quality of TV reception. These TV's were not commercially available, despite being included in the goods catalog for trade network of the USSR.

The broadcasting with this system lasted about 3 years and was ceased well before SECAM transmissions started in the USSR. None of the current multi-standard TV receivers can support this TV system.

NTSC-film

Film content commonly shot at 24 frames/s can be converted to 30 frames/s through the telecine process to duplicate frames as needed.

Mathematically for NTSC this is relatively simple as it is only needed to duplicate every fourth frame. Various techniques are employed. NTSC with an actual frame rate of   (approximately 23.976) frames/s is often defined as NTSC-film. A process known as pullup, also known as pulldown, generates the duplicated frames upon playback. This method is common for H.262/MPEG-2 Part 2 digital video so the original content is preserved and played back on equipment that can display it or can be converted for equipment that cannot.

Canada/US video game region
Sometimes NTSC-U, NTSC-US,  or NTSC-U/C is used to describe the video gaming region of North America (the U/C refers to US + Canada), as regional lockout usually restricts games from being playable outside the region.

Comparative quality

For NTSC, and to a lesser extent, PAL, reception problems can degrade the color accuracy of the picture where ghosting can dynamically change the phase of the color burst with picture content, thus altering the color balance of the signal.  The only receiver compensation is in the professional TV receiver ghost canceling circuits used by cable companies.  The vacuum-tube electronics used in televisions through the 1960s led to various technical problems. Among other things, the color burst phase would often drift.  In addition, the TV studios did not always transmit properly, leading to hue changes when channels were changed, which is why NTSC televisions were equipped with a tint control. PAL and SECAM televisions had less of a need for one.  SECAM in particular was very robust, but PAL, while excellent in maintaining skin tones which viewers are particularly sensitive to, nevertheless would distort other colors in the face of phase errors.  With phase errors, only "Deluxe PAL" receivers would get rid of "Hanover bars" distortion.  Hue controls are still found on NTSC TVs, but color drifting generally ceased to be a problem for more modern circuitry by the 1970s. When compared to PAL, in particular, NTSC color accuracy and consistency were sometimes considered inferior, leading to video professionals and television engineers jokingly referring to NTSC as Never The Same Color, Never Twice the Same Color, or No True Skin Colors, while for the more expensive PAL system it was necessary to Pay for Additional Luxury.

PAL has also been referred to as Peace At Last, Perfection At Last or Pictures Always Lovely in the color war. This mostly applied to vacuum tube-based TVs, however, and later-model solid state sets using Vertical Interval Reference signals have less of a difference in quality between NTSC and PAL. This color phase, "tint", or "hue" control allows for anyone skilled in the art to easily calibrate a monitor with SMPTE color bars, even with a set that has drifted in its color representation, allowing the proper colors to be displayed.  Older PAL television sets did not come with a user accessible "hue" control (it was set at the factory), which contributed to its reputation for reproducible colors.

The use of NTSC coded color in S-Video systems, as well as the use of closed-circuit composite NTSC, both eliminate the phase distortions because there is no reception ghosting in a closed-circuit system to smear the color burst.  For VHS videotape on the horizontal axis and frame rate of the three color systems when used with this scheme, the use of S-Video gives the higher resolution picture quality on monitors and TVs without a high-quality motion-compensated comb filtering section.  (The NTSC resolution on the vertical axis is lower than the European standards, 525 lines against 625.) However, it uses too much bandwidth for over-the-air transmission. The Atari 800 and Commodore 64 home computers generated S-video, but only when used with specially designed monitors as no TV at the time supported the separate chroma and luma on standard RCA jacks. In 1987, a standardized four-pin mini-DIN socket was introduced for S-video input with the introduction of S-VHS players, which were the first device produced to use the four-pin plugs. However, S-VHS never became very popular. Video game consoles in the 1990s began offering S-video output as well.

The mismatch between NTSC's 30 frames per second and film's 24 frames is overcome by a process that capitalizes on the field rate of the interlaced NTSC signal, thus avoiding the film playback speedup used for 576i systems at 25 frames per second (which causes the accompanying audio to increase in pitch slightly, sometimes rectified with the use of a pitch shifter) at the price of some jerkiness in the video. See Frame rate conversion above.

Vertical interval reference
The standard NTSC video image contains some lines (lines 1–21 of each field) that are not visible (this is known as the Vertical Blanking Interval, or VBI); all are beyond the edge of the viewable image, but only lines 1–9 are used for the vertical-sync and equalizing pulses. The remaining lines were deliberately blanked in the original NTSC specification to provide time for the electron beam in CRT screens to return to the top of the display.

VIR (or Vertical interval reference), widely adopted in the 1980s, attempts to correct some of the color problems with NTSC video by adding studio-inserted reference data for luminance and chrominance levels on line 19. Suitably equipped television sets could then employ these data in order to adjust the display to a closer match of the original studio image. The actual VIR signal contains three sections, the first having 70 percent luminance and the same chrominance as the color burst signal, and the other two having 50 percent and 7.5 percent luminance respectively.

A less-used successor to VIR, GCR, also added ghost (multipath interference) removal capabilities.

The remaining vertical blanking interval lines are typically used for datacasting or ancillary data such as video editing timestamps (vertical interval timecodes or SMPTE timecodes on lines 12–14), test data on lines 17–18, a network source code on line 20 and closed captioning, XDS, and V-chip data on line 21. Early teletext applications also used vertical blanking interval lines 14–18 and 20, but teletext over NTSC was never widely adopted by viewers.

Many stations transmit TV Guide On Screen (TVGOS) data for an electronic program guide on VBI lines. The primary station in a market will broadcast 4 lines of data, and backup stations will broadcast 1 line. In most markets the PBS station is the primary host. TVGOS data can occupy any line from 10–25, but in practice its limited to 11–18, 20 and line 22. Line 22 is only used for 2 broadcast, DirecTV and CFPL-TV.

TiVo data is also transmitted on some commercials and program advertisements so that customers can autorecord the program being advertised, and is also used in weekly half-hour paid programs on Ion Television and the Discovery Channel which highlight TiVo promotions and advertisers.

Countries and territories that are using or once used NTSC

Below countries and territories currently use or once used the NTSC system. Many of these have switched or are currently switching from NTSC to digital television standards such as ATSC (United States, Canada, Mexico, Suriname, Jamaica, South Korea), ISDB (Japan, Philippines and part of South America), DVB-T (Taiwan, Panama, Colombia, Myanmar, and Trinidad and Tobago) or DTMB (Cuba).

 
 
 
 
 
 
 
  (Over-the-air NTSC broadcasts (Channel 9) have been terminated as of March 2016, local broadcast stations have now switched to digital channels 20.1 and 20.2.)
 
 
 
  (Over-the-air NTSC broadcasting in major cities ceased August 2011 as a result of legislative fiat, to be replaced with ATSC. Some one-station markets or markets served only by full-power repeaters remain analog.)
 
 
  (Analog shutoff scheduled to 2022, simulcasting in ISDB-Tb.)
  (Analog shutoff scheduled to 2022, simulcasting DVB-T.)
  (NTSC broadcast to be abandoned by December 2018, simulcasting ISDB-Tb.)
 
 
 
  (Over-the-air NTSC broadcasting scheduled to be abandoned by 2021, simulcast in ATSC.)
 
  (Over-the-air NTSC broadcasting scheduled to be abandoned by January 1, 2020, simulcast in ISDB-Tb.)
 
 
 
 
 
  (Over-the-air NTSC broadcasting scheduled to be abandoned by December 2020, simulcast in ISDB-Tb.)
  (Will convert to ATSC 3.0 instead of 1.0. The conversion will begin in 2022 and is expected to be completed by 2023.) 
 (fully switched to ISDB in 2012, after the 2011 Tōhoku earthquake and tsunami delayed the planned 2011 rollout in three prefectures)
  (in Compact of Free Association with US; US aid funded NTSC adoption)
  plans to transition from NTSC announced on July 2, 2004, started conversion in 2013 full transition was scheduled for December 31, 2015, but due to technical and economic issues for some transmitters, the full transition was extended to be completed on December 31, 2016.
  (in Compact of Free Association with US, transitioning to DVB-T)
  (a US military base)
 
 
 
 
  (in Compact of Free Association with US; adopted NTSC before independence)
  (NTSC broadcasts to be abandoned by 2020, simulcasting DVB-T. NTSC broadcasts to be abandoned in areas with more than 90% of DVB-T reception.)
 , (NTSC broadcast to be abandoned by December 31, 2017, simulcasting ISDB-Tb.)
  (NTSC broadcast was intended to be abandoned at the end of 2015; however, in later 2014, it was postponed to 2019. All analog broadcast is expected to be shut off in 2023. It will simulcast in ISDB-T.)
  (now uses ATSC)
 
 
 
  (used NTSC, SECAM and PAL, before switching to PAL in the early 1990s)
  (also used 8 MHz spacing of DVB-T2 (same bandwidth spacing in European Netherlands) on Encrypted Terrestrial Digital TV subscription via WTN CABLE)
 
 
  (Will convert to ATSC 3.0 instead of 1.0. The conversion will begin in 2023 and is expected to be completed by 2026.

 
  (Full-power over-the-air NTSC broadcasting was switched off on June 12, 2009 in favor of ATSC. Low-power stations, Class A stations were switched off on September 1, 2015. Translators and other Low-power stations were supposed to transition on the same day Class-A stations shut off analog services but it was postponed to July 13, 2021, due to a spectrum auction. Most remaining analog cable television systems are also not affected.)

Experimented
  (Between 1962 and 1963, Rede Tupi and Rede Excelsior made the first unofficial transmissions in color, in specific programs in the city of São Paulo, before the official adoption of PAL-M by the Brazilian Government on February 19, 1972)
 
  (Experimented on 405-line variant of NTSC, then UK chose 625-line for PAL broadcasting.)

Countries and territories that have ceased using NTSC
The following countries and regions no longer use NTSC for terrestrial broadcasts.

See also
 Broadcast television systems
 Advanced Television Systems Committee standards
 BTSC
 NTSC-J
 NTSC-C
 PAL
 RCA
 SECAM
Composite artifact colors
Dot crawl
 List of common resolutions – Television
 List of video connectors
 Moving image formats
 Oldest television station
 Television channel frequencies
 Very high frequency
 Ultra high frequency
 Knife-edge effect
 Channel 1 (North American TV)
 Channel 37
 North American broadcast television frequencies
 North American cable television frequencies
 Australasian TV frequencies
 Broadcast-safe
 Digital television transition in the United States
 Glossary of video terms

References

Sources
 A standard defining the NTSC system was published by the International Telecommunication Union in 1998 under the title "Recommendation ITU-R BT.470-7, Conventional Analog Television Systems". It is publicly available on the Internet at ITU-R BT.470-7 or can be purchased from the ITU.
 Ed Reitan (1997). "CBS Field Sequential Color System"

External links
 National Television System Committee
 US cable television channel frequencies
 Commercial Television Frequencies – at TVTower.com
 Representation of the NTSC refresh rate on a television and on a DVD
 "Why 59.94 vs 60 Hz"

History of television
ITU-R recommendations
Television terminology
Television transmission standards
Video formats
Video signal